Stipax is a genus of spiders in the family Sparassidae, with a single species, Stipax triangulifer, first described in 1898. The description was based on a male collected in 1894. No specimens have been found since and the species has been declared extinct. It was endemic to Mahe Island in the Seychelles.

References

Sparassidae
Extinct arachnids
Extinct invertebrates since 1500
Endemic fauna of Seychelles
Monotypic Araneomorphae genera
Spiders of Africa